Erotica is the fifth studio album by American singer Madonna, released on October 20, 1992, by Maverick and Sire Records. The album was released simultaneously with Madonna's first book publication Sex, a coffee table book containing explicit photographs featuring the singer, and marked her first release under Maverick, her own multimedia entertainment company. Erotica is a concept album about sex and romance, incorporating her alter ego Mistress Dita, inspired by actress Dita Parlo. Some of its songs also take on a more confessional tone, influenced by the loss of two of Madonna's close friends to AIDS.

Madonna recorded the album in New York City with Shep Pettibone and André Betts while she was working on her book and film projects. She began creating the album's demos with Pettibone in his apartment in October 1991, and wrote the melodies and lyrics on top of the basic music which Pettibone produced in the style of his remixes. During the sessions, they had problems during sequencing, and, as a result, Pettibone kept trying to move development as fast as possible as he did not want Madonna to lose interest in the music. According to him, Madonna's compositions were serious and intense, moving the creative direction of the songs into a deeply personal territory.

Erotica received generally favorable reviews from critics, who regarded it as one of Madonna's most adventurous albums and praised her comments on taboos and AIDS. Commercially, the album was less successful than Madonna's previous albums, peaking at number 2 on the US Billboard 200, becoming her first studio album not to top the chart since her debut. Internationally, it topped the charts in Australia, Finland, and France, and peaked within the top five of several other countries such as Canada, Germany, Japan, New Zealand, and the United Kingdom. Erotica was later certified double-platinum by the Recording Industry Association of America and has sold more than six million copies worldwide.

Six singles were released from the album, including the title track and "Deeper and Deeper", both of which reached the top ten of the US Billboard Hot 100. The album was supported by The Girlie Show World Tour, which visited cities in Europe, North America, Latin America, Asia, and Australia in 1993. Somewhat overlooked at the time of its release in part due to the backlash surrounding the Sex book, Erotica has been retrospectively considered one of "The 100 Best Albums of the 1990s" by Slant Magazine and one of the most revolutionary albums of all time by the Rock and Roll Hall of Fame. Many critics have since noted the album's influence on the works by female artists such as Janet Jackson and Beyoncé.

Background 
Ten years after signing her first recording contract with Sire Records, Madonna founded her own multi-media entertainment company, Maverick, consisting of a record company (Maverick Records), a film production company (Maverick Films), and associated music publishing, television broadcasting, book publishing and merchandising divisions. The deal was a joint venture with Time Warner and paid Madonna an advance of $60 million. It gave her 20% royalties from the music proceedings, one of the highest rates in the industry, equaled at that time only by Michael Jackson's royalty rate established a year earlier with Sony. Madonna said that she envisioned the company as an "artistic think tank" and likened it to a cross between the Bauhaus, the innovative German arts institute formed in Weimar in 1919, and Andy Warhol's New York-based Factory of artists and assistants. She stated: "It started as a desire to have more control. There's a group of writers, photographers, directors and editors that I've met along the way in my career who I want to take with me everywhere I go. I want to incorporate them into my little factory of ideas. I also come in contact with a lot of young talent that I feel entrepreneurial about." The first two projects from the venture were her fifth studio album, Erotica, and a coffee table book of photographs featuring Madonna, entitled Sex.

Madonna primarily collaborated with Shep Pettibone for the album. Pettibone first began working with Madonna during the 1980s, providing remixes for several of her singles. He later co-wrote and co-produced the lead single from the soundtrack album I'm Breathless, "Vogue", which topped the Billboard Hot 100 in 1990. The same year, Pettibone worked with Madonna on her greatest hits album The Immaculate Collection, co-producing new song "Rescue Me" and remixing her earlier songs for the compilation using audio technology QSound. During the recording session of Erotica, Madonna and Pettibone worked on "This Used to Be My Playground", the soundtrack single of the 1992 film A League of Their Own. It became Madonna's tenth Hot 100 chart-topper, making her the female artist with the most US number-one singles at the time. Alongside Pettibone, Madonna enlisted help from producer André Betts, who previously co-produced "Justify My Love" for The Immaculate Collection. Madonna said that she was interested to work with Pettibone and Betts due to their ability to remain plugged into the dance underground, "They come from opposite ends of the spectrum in terms of their music style and approach to music, but they're both connected to the street and they're still young and hungry."

Development 

Having started his career as a remixer, Pettibone built the basic music of the Erotica songs in the style of his remixes for which Madonna wrote the melodies and lyrics. According to Pettibone in an article "Erotica Diaries" published on Madonna's Icon magazine, he began with a tape of three tracks for Madonna to listen to, before he traveled to Chicago, where she was filming A League of Their Own. She listened to the songs and liked all of them. After filming was complete, Madonna met Pettibone in New York City to start working on demos in his apartment in October 1991. Their schedule was sporadic in the beginning. Madonna and Pettibone were in the studio for a week and then she would work with Steven Meisel on Sex, for two weeks. Occasionally, Madonna also would meet André Betts. At first, Madonna did not like the first group of songs she had recorded. She wanted Erotica to have a raw edge to it, as if it were recorded in an alley in Harlem, and not a light glossy production to permeate her sound, according to Pettibone. "Deeper and Deeper" was not working for Madonna. Pettibone said they tried different bridges and changes, but in the end, Madonna wanted the middle of the song to have a flamenco guitar.

They had problems during sequencing and had to repair the songs, taking some time. Pettibone had to keep things moving as fast as possible as he did not want Madonna to lose interest in the music. At this point, as far as the music went, it was getting a little melancholy. However, as Pettibone explained, Madonna's stories directed the creative direction of the songs into deeply personal territory as they were more serious and intense. Madonna left the album's production to work on her next film Body of Evidence in Oregon. Shortly after, Pettibone started on a song called "Goodbye to Innocence", which was not working. He further commented that he made a new bass line for the track. When Madonna went to record her vocals for "Goodbye to Innocence", she started singing Little Willie John's song "Fever" instead of singing the original words. They decided to record it, as they felt it sounded good. As they did not know the words, Madonna called Seymour Stein from Sire Records, and within an hour, they had the Peggy Lee version, and the original version of the song. This song was the last to be recorded for the album, in August 1992, and it was finished within a month later.

Music and lyrics 

Erotica is a concept album about sex and romance, on which she incorporated an alter-ego named Mistress Dita, heavily inspired by actress Dita Parlo. Musically, the album mixes dance, electronica, hip hop, deep house, ambient techno and R&B, and incorporates elements from classic disco, modern house, techno and new jack swing. Lyrically, the album played on innuendos and double entendres instead of explicit words. "Erotica" is the opening track from the album. Starting with Madonna saying "My name is Dita", she invites her lover to be passive, while she tells him to "do as I say" and leads him to explore boundaries between pain and pleasure. It deals with sex hang-ups, and has been described as "an ode to S&M". Her cover version of "Fever" follows the title track. It is described as a "sassy, house-style remake" of the pop standard. The third track, "Bye Bye Baby," starts with the declaration, "This is not a love song," and goes on to ask questions of a lover she is about to abandon. At one point, Madonna asks angrily: "Does it make you feel good to see me cry?" The fourth track from Erotica, "Deeper and Deeper," is described as one of the "pure disco" moments of the album. Its bridge features a flamenco guitar, and its lyrics talk about sexual obsession.

In "Where Life Begins", Madonna promises to teach "a different kind of kiss" to the listener. In the song, Madonna talks about the pleasures of oral sex and also references safe sex. The sixth track is "Bad Girl". It talks about a woman who would rather get drunk than end a relationship she is too neurotic to handle. The seventh song, "Waiting", has been described as a "yearning ballad." Featuring spoken words, it addresses rejection and unrequited love. It ends with lyrics "The next time you want pussy, just look in the mirror, baby." The next track, "Thief of Hearts", is a dark and rumbling song. It uses tough hip-hop language to ward off a rival for her lover's attention. It opens with the smashing of a glass, and Madonna shouting, "Bitch!/Which leg do you want me to break?" and later, she sneers, "Little miss thinks she can have his child/Well anybody can do it." "Words" was compared to the previous track "Thief of Hearts," with music critics finding similarity in scope, each with sharp lyrics and catchy beats. The song features clattering programs and icy synth block-chords.

"Rain" is the tenth track whose lyrics talk about waiting and hoping for love. The song features a crescendo towards the end. The subsequent track, "Why's It So Hard," is considered the album's plea for solidarity with her audience, as Madonna sings: "Why's it so hard to love one another?" The following song, "In This Life," was written in memory of friends who Madonna had lost to the AIDS epidemic. The drums were compared to a doomsday clock and the keyboard intervals were also compared to George Gershwin's blues lullaby "Prelude No. 2," creating a sense of dis-ease. The thirteenth track, "Did You Do It?" features rappers Mark Goodman and Dave Murphy. The song was released exclusively on the explicit version of Erotica; the clean version doesn't have this song.  Producer André Betts claimed that for fun, he just rapped over the track "Waiting," while Madonna was gone, and she liked it after hearing later. The last track from the album, "Secret Garden," is described as Eroticas most personal song. In addition, "Secret Garden" is dedicated to the singer's vagina, "the secret place where she could enjoy herself." It features a jazz-house beat.

Release and promotion 

Erotica was released on October 20, 1992, by Maverick Records. The first album of Madonna's career to bear Parental Advisory label, Erotica was banned in several Asian countries, such as China and Singapore. To promote the album, Madonna appeared on the cover of the October edition of Vogue, where she appeared dressed in "Hippie trip" fashion. These photographs were taken by Meisel. After the book was released, on October 22, 1992, MTV aired a special called The Day in Madonna, hosted by Kurt Loder (the title of this special was a pun of the title of the channel's daily show The Day in Rock), which profiled the release of Madonna's Sex and Erotica, even taking the book to the streets to allow people, including a sex therapist and group of real-life New York City dominatrices, to view it. MTV also interviewed many people who had viewed the Sex book on the day of its release at the HMV music store in New York City. In celebration of the release of the book, the store held a Madonna look-alike contest and set up a booth where people could view the book for one dollar a minute, with all of the proceeds going to Lifebeat, the music industry organization founded to help fund AIDS research.

Madonna additionally performed "Fever" and "Bad Girl" on Saturday Night Live in January 1993. During the latter, she referenced Sinéad O'Connor's actions who had ripped up a photograph of Pope John Paul II and yelled "Fight the real enemy". The photograph Madonna used was of Joey Buttafuoco. During the 1000th The Arsenio Hall Show, Madonna performed the original version of "Fever" accompanied by a band, wearing a black classic dress and smoking a cigarette. Following this performance, Madonna sang "The Lady Is a Tramp" with Anthony Kiedis of the Red Hot Chili Peppers, dressed up in matching skirts, stockings, leather vests and cat-ear caps. On September 2, 1993, Madonna opened the 1993 MTV Video Music Awards performing "Bye Bye Baby" cavorting with three scantily clad women in a brothel-style setting, dressed in tuxedos and top hats, danced with women in corsets in a choreographed, highly sexual routine.

Singles 
"Erotica" was the lead single released from the album in late September 1992. It peaked at number three on the Billboard Hot 100. Internationally, it reached the top ten in Australia, Ireland, New Zealand, Norway and the United Kingdom. Following the release of the song, Lebanese singer Fairuz claimed her vocals appeared on the song without her consent, and said the lyrics "he was hung on a wooded cross today", which was sung in Arabic, were taken from a religious song that is traditionally heard during Easter services. Fairuz sued Madonna for $2.5 million for plagiarism over the Arab section/sampling in her song "Erotica". The song contains a section of a Christian Great Friday hymn that translates "Today, He is held to a cross" while Madonna repeatedly chants over Fairuz's voice 'All over me'. Upon the song's release, the Vatican banned Madonna from entering the Vatican and she was banned on its radio stations. The song and its accompanying album were also banned in Lebanon. An undisclosed settlement was reached between Fairuz and Madonna. The accompanying music video for "Erotica" also suffered mainstream condemnation due to its explicit sexual imagery. MTV put the video into heavy rotation, but only after midnight. But after playing three times during mignight, MTV banned totally the video from rotation and was her second video to banned in MTV after Justify My Love. It was also completely banned from broadcast on NBC and Times Square because its bondage imagery was deemed too racy. 

"Deeper and Deeper" was released as the second single in November 1992. It achieved top-ten success in Belgium, Ireland, the United Kingdom and the United States.

"Bad Girl" was released in February 1993, receiving positive reviews, with music critics naming it "riveting". The song had a modest success on the charts, peaking at number ten on the UK Singles Chart while reaching number 36 on the Billboard Hot 100. 

"Fever" was released as the fourth single of the album in March 1993 in Europe and Australia. It became a top-ten hit in several European countries including Finland, Ireland, and the United Kingdom, while topping the Dance Club Songs chart without a North American release. 

The fifth single, "Rain", was released in July 1993. It peaked at number two in Canada. 

"Bye Bye Baby" was released as the last single from the album in November 1993. It reached the top five in Italy and peaked within the top twenty in Australia.

Tour 

The album was further promoted on her fourth concert tour, the Girlie Show World Tour, which visited Israel and Turkey, Latin America and Australia for the first time in 1993. The tour required 1500 costumes for the cast, and a 24-hour set up time for the stage. Madonna opened the show dressed as a dominatrix, surrounded by topless dancers of both sexes. Lighter moments included Madonna descending from the ceiling on a giant disco ball, wearing an Afro wig for "Express Yourself", as well as the singer singing "Like a Virgin" in the guise of actress Marlene Dietrich and singing the word 'virgin' as 'wirgin'. She caused uproar in Puerto Rico by rubbing their national flag between her legs on stage. Orthodox Jews protested to force the cancellation of the concert in Tel Aviv, Israel. However, the rallies were unsuccessful as the show went on as scheduled. The Girlie Show received positive reviews from critics, and was a commercial
success, grossing around US$70 million.

Critical reception 

Stephen Thomas Erlewine of AllMusic described the album as "ambitious" and noted that Erotica contains some of Madonna's best and most accomplished music. Paul Verna from Billboard considered it her most varied and creatively challenging collection to date, as well as "bottomless with potential hit singles". Arion Berger of Rolling Stone praised the album's "cold, remote sound", and wrote that "Erotica is everything Madonna has been denounced for being — meticulous, calculated, domineering and artificial. It accepts those charges and answers with a brilliant record to prove them". NME said: "When Erotica the album is good – i.e. when it's funny, original, lively and, yes, sexy – it's about as good as the modern media event gets." J. D. Considine of The Baltimore Sun stated that the most surprising thing on the songs is that they find Madonna singing about love, not about sex. Phil Sutcliffe gave three stars in a review for Q, writing: "The biggest surprise is 'Deeper and Deeper', which could be mistaken for a bopalong tribute to Kylie. However, the substance of Erotica resides in a range of straight-talking, almost intimate songs based, not on an idea about sex, but on experience of relationships." In a retrospective review in Blender, Tony Power concluded: "That female artists (except Millie Jackson) never come on this strongly makes Erotica shocking and, well, arousing." The Independents Giles Smith noted that Erotica revealed that "unlike Jackson and Prince and Springsteen and the rest of her established, major league competition, Madonna's albums are still getting better each time".

Charles Aaron from Spin noted that the album is a brave comment on the chilly, tragic detachment of sex under AIDS. Stylus Magazine commented that each song has its own energy. He also noted that "Erotica was too sophisticated for a mainstream besotted with The Bodyguard and a college-radio claque eager to praise R.E.M.'s opaque dirges for the wisdom that Madonna's club fodder showed with less fuss and with a better rhythm section". Robert Christgau commented that "The singer doesn't have great pipes, but because she's too hip to belt [this time], she doesn't need them. She's in control, all understated presence and impersonal personality except when she's flashing some pink. [...] "Love your sister, love your brother" thing, the lyrics are not stupid. I love the rap where the boast turns out to be a lie." Sal Cinquemani of Slant Magazine recognized that "Pettibone's beats might be time-stamped with the sound of a genre that ruled a decade of one-hitters before being replaced by commercialized hip-hop" and classified Madonna's voice as "nasal and remote". David Browne of Entertainment Weekly declared that Erotica may be the most joyless dance music of all time, while criticizing Madonna's "soulless" voice. Stephen Holden from The New York Times wrote that the album is far from Madonna's best album, as the hip-hop songs lack the "musical breadth and confessional poignancy" of Like a Prayer, the record that established Madonna as a mature pop songwriter.

Commercial performance 

In the United States, Erotica debuted at number two on the Billboard 200 on November 7, 1992, with first week sales of 167,000 copies. It was held off from reaching the top spot by Garth Brooks's fourth studio album, The Chase, which that same week sold 4,000 copies more than Erotica. The next week, the album dropped to number four on the chart. It was eventually certified double platinum by the Recording Industry Association of America (RIAA) for shipments of two million units. According to Nielsen SoundScan, Erotica has sold 1.91 million copies in the United States as of December 2016, along with 79,000 sold through BMG Music Clubs. In Canada, the album debuted at number seven on the RPM Albums Chart on November 7, 1992. It reached a peak of number four on November 21, 1992. The album was present for a total of 38 weeks on the chart, and was certified two times platinum by Music Canada (MC) for shipments of 200,000 copies.

Erotica performed well in Latin America, mainly in countries where she toured for the first time. In Argentina, the album received four-times platinum from the Cámara Argentina de Productores de Fonogramas y Videograma (CAPIF) for shipments of 240,000 copies. Similarly in Mexico, Erotica achieved sales of 250,000 units according to Billboard. The album received a gold certification from Pro-Música Brasil, denoting shipments of 100,000 units. Actual sales in Brazil stand at 180,000 copies, as of October 1993.

Across Europe, Erotica sold 1.5 million copies in the first-week and topped the European Top 100 Albums chart. In the United Kingdom, the album debuted at number two on the UK Albums Chart on October 24, 1992. It remained at its peak at number two for three weeks, being held off the top spot by Simple Minds' greatest hits collection Glittering Prize 81/92, and a total of 38 weeks on the chart. The album was certified two times platinum on June 1, 1993, by the British Phonographic Industry (BPI) for shipments of 600,000 copies. In France, the album debuted at number one on the French Albums Chart on October 28, 1992, staying there for two weeks, then descending down the chart, selling a total of 250,000 copies by May 1993. In Germany, the album reached the top five on the Media Control Charts and was certified gold for shipments of 250,000 copies. In Italy, Erotica sold 250,000 copies in its presales. In Sweden, the album debuted in its peak of number six and spent only seven weeks on the chart. Similarly in Switzerland, Erotica peaked number five and was certified gold by IFPI Switzerland. It also received a platinum certification in Spain and sold 150,000 units there as of 1993. By November 1992, the album sold 350 copies in Iceland.

The album also attained success in Asia-Pacific countries. In Australia, Erotica entered the ARIA top 100 albums chart at number one, and was certified triple platinum by the Australian Recording Industry Association (ARIA) for shipments of 210,000 copies. It also reached the top five on the New Zealand Albums Chart. Erotica reached a peak of number five on the Japan Oricon Albums Chart, and received a double platinum certification from the Recording Industry Association of Japan (RIAJ) for shipping 400,000 copies. At the 7th annual Japan Gold Disc Awards, Madonna was awarded the RIAJ's Artist of the Year with sales totaling ¥844 million throughout the year, an equivalent of $6.5 million ($ million in  dollars) Radio Television Hong Kong (RTHK) also awarded Erotica as the Top Selling English Album of 1993. Initial shiptments in Singapore were 20,000 units, and quickly managed to sell 37,000 copies as of November 18 of that year. In total, Erotica has sold more than six million copies worldwide.

Legacy 
The Rock and Roll Hall of Fame considered Erotica one of the most revolutionary albums of all time, declaring that "...few women artists, before or since Erotica, have been so outspoken about their fantasies and desires. Madonna made it clear that shame and sexuality are mutually exclusive... In the end, Erotica embraced and espoused pleasure, and kept Madonna at the forefront of pop's sexual revolution." Slant Magazine listed Erotica at number 24 on "The 100 Best Albums of the 1990s", calling it a "dark masterpiece". Miles Raymer of Entertainment Weekly said that "in retrospect it's her strongest album — produced at the peak of her power and provocativeness... and helped elevate her from mere pop star to an era-defining icon." Bianca Gracie from Fuse TV channel called Erotica "the album that changed the pop music world forever... one of the most controversial and genre-defining albums in pop history." Samuel R. Murrian from Parade commented that the influence of Erotica "is seen in the work of virtually every current pop act".

J. Randy Taraborrelli documented at the time of Eroticas release, "much of society seemed to reexamining its sexuality. Gay rights issues were at the forefront of social discussions globally, as was an ever-increasing awareness of AIDS." Barry Walters from Rolling Stone noted that the album's greatest contribution is "[its] embrace of the other, which in this case means queerness, blackness, third-wave feminism, exhibitionism and kink. Madonna took what was marginalized at the worst of the AIDS epidemic, placed it in an emancipated context, and shoved it into the mainstream for all to see and hear." Brian McNair, the author of Striptease Culture: Sex, Media and the Democratization of Desire, stated that upon the album's release "academic books began to appear about the 'Madonna phenomenon', while pro- and anti-porn feminists made of her a symbol of all that was good or bad (depending on their viewpoint) about contemporary sexual culture." Daryl Deino from The Inquisitr dubbed the album as "a groundbreaking moment for feminism."

Erotica remains the most rampantly misrepresented Madonna album with the biggest backlash of her career. Taraborrelli commented that it is unfortunate that Erotica has to be historically linked to other less memorable ventures in Madonna's career at this time. However, he quipped that the album should be considered on its own merits, not only as one linked to the other two adult-oriented projects, because it has true value. When asked to name her biggest professional disappointment, Madonna answered, "The fact that my Erotica album was overlooked because of the whole thing with the Sex book. It just got lost in all that. I think there's some brilliant songs on it and people didn't give it a chance." Brian McNair observed that Madonna took a financial risk with the album and it was not until Ray of Light (1998) that her record sales recovered to pre-Erotica levels. He further asserted that "what she lost in royalty payments, however, Madonna more than made up for in iconic status and cultural influence."

Walters asserted that Erotica "set the blueprint for modern pop... Without Madonna, modern pop as we know it would be unimaginable." He noticed the album's influence on various artists such as Beyoncé, Britney Spears, Christina Aguilera, Pink, Lady Gaga, and Nicki Minaj. Joe Lynch from Billboard wrote that the album "occupies a watershed place in the pop pantheon, setting the blueprint for singers to get raw while eschewing exploitation for decades to come." Similar thoughts were echoed by Jeni Wren Stottrup from The Portland Mercury, who believed that "Erotica should be recognized as one of Madonna's greatest albums". Critics also found its influence on Janet Jackson's 1997 album The Velvet Rope, with Daryl Easlea from BBC writing that Jackson's album "resembles Erotica at times, in subject manner and style."

Track listing 
All tracks produced by Madonna and Shep Pettibone, except where noted.

Notes
Clean version of the album does not include, "Did You Do It?".
Anthony Shimkin has been officially added by ASCAP as a co-writer to "Erotica", "Bye Bye Baby", "Bad Girl", "Thief of Hearts", "Words", and "Why's It So Hard". Inlay notes to the album do not include this. Shimkin was only allowed to add his credit to one composition on the album; he originally chose "Deeper and Deeper".
"Fever" contains lyrics written and rearranged by singer Peggy Lee who remains uncredited for her contribution.

Formats 
CD – Explicit version with 14 tracks including the track "Did You Do It?" This version comes with a Parental Advisory label.
CD – 13 track clean version
CD Collector's Edition – Australian collector's digipak edition released in 1993 to celebrate The Girlie Show World Tour in that country. Explicit version with 14 tracks including the track "Did You Do It?"
Vinyl – Explicit version with 14 tracks including the track "Did You Do It?" This version also comes with a Parental Advisory label. The vinyl was reissued in 2012 and 2016 by Warner Bros. Records with a different catalog number.
Vinyl – 13 track clean version
Cassette – 13 track version
Digital Compact Cassette – European explicit version with 14 tracks including the track "Did You Do It?". This version comes with a Parental Advisory label.

Personnel 
Credits adapted from the album's liner notes.

Madonna – vocals, production
Shep Pettibone – production, engineering, keyboard, sequencing
André Betts – production, synthesizer, bass, piano, strings, drums, keyboard, synthesizer strings
Emile Charlap – contractor
Donna De Lory and Niki Haris – background vocals
Jerome Dickens – guitar
Glen Dicterow – conductor, concertmaster
Anton Fig – drums
Mark Goodman – vocals, assistant engineer
Joe Moskowitz – drums, keyboard, programming
Dave Murphy – voices
Paul Pesco – guitar
James Preston – piano, keyboard, synthesizer strings
Tony Shimkin – keyboard, background vocals, engineer, sequencing, drum programming, programming
Danny Wilensky – saxophone
Doug Wimbish – bass
Technical
Mike Farrell – engineer
Robin Hancock – engineer, mixing
George Karras – engineer
P. Dennis Mitchell – engineer
Ted Jensen – mastering
Sander Selover – programming
Jeremy Lublock – string arrangements
Siung Fat Tjia – art direction, design
Steven Meisel – photography

Charts

Weekly charts

Year-end charts

Certifications and sales

See also 
List of European number-one hits of 1992
List of number-one albums in Australia during the 1990s

Notes

References

Bibliography

External links 
 
 
 Library + Archives: Erotica at the Rock and Roll Hall of Fame

1992 albums
Concept albums
Madonna albums
Maverick Records albums
Sire Records albums
Albums produced by Madonna
Warner Records albums
Albums involved in plagiarism controversies
Hip hop albums by American artists
Contemporary R&B albums by American artists
Deep house albums